The Nanaimo Civic Arena was an indoor arena located in Nanaimo, British Columbia. It was built in 1939 and hosted the British Columbia Hockey League's Nanaimo Clippers, The Nanaimo Timbermen, among many other teams. The arena officially closed on September 9, 2006 and was torn down in November to make way for a proposed twin condominium tower complex. The new home of the Clippers is the modern Frank Crane Arena.

References

Defunct indoor arenas in Canada
Defunct indoor ice hockey venues in Canada
Sports venues in British Columbia
Western Hockey League arenas
Buildings and structures in Nanaimo
Sport in Nanaimo
1939 establishments in British Columbia
Sports venues completed in 1939
2006 disestablishments in British Columbia
Sports venues demolished in 2006
Demolished buildings and structures in British Columbia